Ixcatlán may refer to:

San Pedro Ixcatlán, Oaxaca
Santo Domingo Ixcatlán, Oaxaca
Santa María Ixcatlán, Oaxaca
Ixcatlán Mazatec language